Geocoma is an extinct genus of brittle stars that lived in the Jurassic. Its fossils are known from Europe.

Sources
 Fossils (Smithsonian Handbooks) by David Ward (Page 189)

External links
Geocoma in the Paleobiology Database

Prehistoric Asterozoa genera
Ophiuroidea genera
Jurassic echinoderms
Prehistoric animals of Europe
Fossil taxa described in 1850